Tilokaraj, also spelt Tilokarat and Tilokkarat, was the 9th monarch of the Mangrai Dynasty.

Early life
According to the Chiang Mai Chronicle, he was the sixth child of King Sam Phraya (also known as Samfangkaen). The 'lok' part of his name means sixth.

King of Lan Na

He became king in 1443 by deposing his father, and within a year had imposed control over Nan and Phrae. He also attacked Chiang Rung, and the Shan region several times but could not impose control. He faced several revolts. He had his favorite son, Bunruang, executed on suspicion of disloyalty. While clearly a warlike ruler, he was also a vigorous patron of Sri Lankan-style Buddhism, building several monasteries including Wat Chet Yot and Wat Pa Daeng, and enlarging Wat Chedi Luang to house the Emerald Buddha.

See also
List of rulers of Lan Na
Đại Việt-Lan Xang War (1479–84)

References

Citations

Sources
 
 

Rulers of Chiang Mai
1409 births
1487 deaths
Tai history
Thai monarchs
15th century in Thailand
15th-century monarchs in Asia